Flags of the Royal Thai Armed Forces. Most of the flags used by the Thai military today were stipulated in the Flag Act of 1979 (พระราชบัญญัติ ธง พ.ศ. ๒๕๒๒).

Head of the Armed Forces

Ministry of Defence of Thailand

Royal Thai Armed Forces Headquarters

Royal Thai Army

Army unit colour

King's Own Bodyguards

Army command flags

Army rank flags

Army identification flag

Historical army flags

Royal Thai Navy

Naval command flags

Naval rank flags

Historical naval flags

Royal Thai Air Force

Air Force unit colour

Air Force command flags

Air Force rank flags

Historical air force flags

Historical war flags

Historical units

References

External links

 Siam Flag museum
 Thai Naval ensign and others naval flags (from Thai Naval Museum) (Thai only)
 Thai naval flags (Thai only)

See also
List of Thai flags
Royal Flags of Thailand
Royal Thai Armed Forces
Sudarshana Chakra- for the symbolism and meaning of the 'Chakras'

Military flags
T
Flags of Thailand
Military of Thailand
Military history of Thailand